Lindsay Grace is a video game designer, artist, professor, and writer who currently lives in Miami, FL. He is best known as an academic game designer who employs critical design. He is the 2019 Games for Change Vanguard Award winner and Knight Chair at the University of Miami. He served as founding director of the American University Game Lab and Studio (JOLT), which includes the Fake News game, Factitious, the NPR game Commuter Challenge and Miami Herald's Gaming the System. In 2013 his game, Wait was inducted in the Games for Change Hall of Fame as one of the five most significant games for change in the last decade.  Created in 2009, players must navigate a 3D world that fades away when the player moves, and grows more detailed as they wait. If players fail to move for long, the world also recedes.  Other notable games include Big Huggin', a game controlled by a giant stuffed animal that players must hug to meet game goals. Big Huggin' was Kickstarted with notable support from Jane McGonigal and selected for the ACM SIGGRAPH's Aesthetics of Gameplay Show.

Grace has created more than 15 independent games, acting as the sole designer, developer, and artist. He has written articles about this process and supports such activity as one of 8 executive board members organizing the Global Game Jam.  He also exhibits art internationally and curates exhibits. He co-curated the Indie Arcade 2014 and 2016 events  at the Smithsonian American Art Museum.

Lindsay Grace has publicly opposed  the link between video games and violence.

Career 
Grace is Knight Chair at the University of Miami. He is Vice President of both the Global Game Jam and the Higher Education Video Game Alliance.

Grace lead the games program at American University School of Communication in Washington D.C. Grace has published more than 45 academic articles since 2009.

He was the C. Michael Armstrong Professor of Creative Arts at Miami University/Armstrong Institute for Interactive Media Studies at Miami University where he ran the Persuasive Play Laboratory. He taught video game design, interaction design and theory at American University.

He publishes writing and video games that relate the concept of "philosophy of software"  and Critical Design as practice in the arts and games.  This practice falls between captology and critical design.

The Critical Gameplay games  employ theories in the design of video games and society. The work for Critical Gameplay has been shown in more than 15 cities including Athens, São Paulo,  Rio de Janeiro, Vancouver, Taipei, Chicago, Paris and Istanbul. It is internationally recognized.

Grace's independent video game publications include Penguin Roll, Zombie Master, Polyglot Cubed and several games under the Mindtoggle Software company. He also writes about games and independent game-making. According to App Annie statistics, his Game Black Like Me was a top 100 game in 3 countries (United States, Sweden and South Korea) by number of daily downloads.

In 2008, Grace created Polyglot Cubed which was recognized at the Meaningful play conference at Michigan State, was a serious games showcase finalist at the Interservice/Industry Training, Simulation and Education Conference IITSEC, and the International Conference on Advances in Computer Entertainment Technology. Gamasutra ran an article about it. His research includes algorithmic music generation using visual emergent behavior.

He is an alumnus of the Electronic Visualization Laboratory at the University of Illinois as well as two degrees from Northwestern University.

Select publications and exhibits

2005
 Cineme Midwestern Game Developers Conference (2005) - Lecturer
 Westwood College PAC Curriculum - Advisory committee

2008
 Meaningful play, Michigan State University (2008) - Game Exhibitor
 International Conferences on Advances in Human Computer Interaction, Mexico (2009) - A Universally Designed, Device-Independent Email Client

2009
 IITSEC, Orlando, Florida (2009) - Serious Games Showcase
 International Conferences on Advancements in Computer Entertainment, Athens, Greece (2009) - Game Exhibitor
 International Digital Media and Arts Association, Ball State University, USA

2010
 CHI (conference), Atlanta, USA

2011
 ISEA, Istanbul, USA
 Games, Learning and Society, Wisconsin, USA

2012
 Electronic Language International Festival, São Paulo, Brazil
 Artscape (festival), Baltimore, USA
 Conference on Human Factors in Computing Systems, Austin, Texas

2013
 Games for Change, New York, USA
 Electronic Language International Festival, São Paulo, Brazil
 CHI (conference), Paris, France

2014
 ArtScience Museum, Singapore, Singapore
 SIGGRAPH, New York, USA
 College Art Association Annual Conference, Cassidy Theater at the Chicago Cultural Center, Chicago, USA

2015
 Game Developers Conference, "In the Hearts of Players: Affection Games and Mobile Love" (March 2015), Game Developers Conference, San Francisco, California, United States
 Game Developers Conference,  "Education Soapbox" (March 2015), Game Developers Conference, San Francisco, California, United States
 SXSW,  "Gaming 4 Gov Impact" (March 2015), SXSW, Austin, Texas, Texas, United States

2016
 Game Developers Conference, "Community Engagement at the Intersection of Games and News" (March 2016), Game Developers Conference, San Francisco, California, United States
 Game Developers Conference, "Who Owns What and Why? Student IP, Faculty IP, and Game Design Programs" (March 2016), Game Developers Conference, San Francisco, California, United States
 Online News Association, Keynote "What Journalists Can Learn from Game Designers About Engagement" (April 2016),  Online News Association, London

2017
 Game Developers Conference, "It's not all about unicorns, sustainable diversity in the classroom" (March 2017), Game Developers Conference, San Francisco, California, United States

2018
 Game Developers Conference, "Cuba, Nairobi, Borneo-Oh My, Creating Games Education Very Abroad" (March 2016), Game Developers Conference, San Francisco, California, United States

2019
Grace, Lindsay D. (2019). Doing Things with Games: Social Impact Through Play. CRC Press. . Retrieved August 22, 2019.

2020
Grace, L. (2020). Love and Electronic Affection: A Design Primer (editor/author), Routledge Press,  . Retrieved September 28, 2020.

Grace, L. and Huang, K. State of Newsgames 2020 (from Games for Change: https://g4c2020.sched.com/event/cj9a/newsgame-flyby-state-of-the-practice-2020). Report at  Retrieved September 29, 2020

2021
Grace, Lindsay (2021): Black Games Studies. Carnegie Mellon University ETC Press. Book. https://doi.org/10.1184/R1/17100431.v1

See also

 Critical Gameplay
 Big Huggin'

References

External links
 Lindsay Grace's website
Publications by Grace
 University of Miami Faculty Profile
 The Critical Gameplay Project
 ACM Portal Publications List
 Article by Lindsay Grace
 Review of his Make Me an Offer Art Show
 Play Committee Members
 List of Global Game Jam Original Organizers
 Newspaper article about University of Miami Game design
 Gamasutra Article about Lindsay Grace

See also

 Critical Gameplay
 American University

Living people
New media artists
Artists from Chicago
Year of birth missing (living people)
American video game designers